Malaysia competed in the 1985 Southeast Asian Games held in Bangkok, Thailand from 8 to 17 December 1985.

Medal summary

Medals by sport

Medallists

Football

Men's tournament
Group B

Semifinal

Bronze medal match

References

1985
Nations at the 1985 Southeast Asian Games